Haplosclerida is an order of demosponges. It contains the following families:

 Calcifibrospongiidae Hartman, 1979
 Callyspongiidae de Laubenfels, 1936
 Chalinidae Gray, 1867
 Niphatidae Van Soest, 1980
 Petrosiidae Van Soest, 1980
 Phloeodictyidae Carter, 1882

References